"Paralyzer" is a song by Canadian rock band Finger Eleven. It was released as the lead single from their fourth studio album, Them vs. You vs. Me, on March 1, 2007. The song received high airplay in both the United States and Canada, and was performed live on the March 14, 2007 episode of The Tonight Show with Jay Leno and again ten months later on January 9, 2008, in a testament to the longevity of the single's success. The song has surpassed "One Thing" to be Finger Eleven's most successful single.

Composition
Finger Eleven's frontman Scott Anderson has said that the single has a feel distinct from the rest of Finger Eleven's music, possessing more of a funk rock or dance-rock sound. However, the song has also been characterized as alternative rock. The style of the song has been compared to (though inspired by) "Take Me Out", a 2004 single by indie rock band Franz Ferdinand. Finger Eleven occasionally performed "Take Me Out" during the middle of Paralyzer in live performances as a part of a medley along with "Trampled Under Foot" by Led Zeppelin and "Another Brick in the Wall (Part II)" by Pink Floyd. "Paralyzer" is about feeling uncomfortable in a dance club. Drummer Rich Beddoe said "It's something the whole band feels". He added,

 

The single has three versions; one is the original CD version, while the other two are radio edit versions, in which the line containing the word "shitty" is either censored or replaced with "shady". The song alludes to the band's prior hit "One Thing" with the lyric "I should just stay home, if one thing really means one".

Music video
The video was released on YouTube. It starts with a man, walking, who begins to intersperse his steps with dance moves. He looks into windows and in the reflection, he sees himself with dancers around him, but when he turns he sees a woman. The two begin to dance with the symbolic dancers returning in greater numbers every time the chorus repeats. The video alternates between shots of the band playing on a rooftop that overlooks the dancers in a seemingly abandoned street.

The video reached number eight on VH1's weekly VSpot Top 20 Countdown. On the channel's year-end Top 40 Videos of 2007, it placed at number 23, despite only having spent (at the time) one week on its weekly Top 20 Countdown.

Chart performance
"Paralyzer" debuted on the U.S. Billboard Hot 100 at number 97 in June 2007. It proceeded to slowly gain in airplay and digital sales over the months. For the chart week of November 24, 2007 (over six months after the song was released), it became the band's first-career top 10 hit on the Billboard Hot 100, rising from number 14 to number 10. The song then rose to peak at number six on the Hot 100 over a month later, for the chart week of January 5, 2008. The song became the band's first number one on the Mainstream Rock and Alternative charts. It also became their second top five song on the Alternative Chart after "One Thing", which had peaked at number five, and it later tied 30 Seconds to Mars "The Kill (Bury Me)" and Red Jumpsuit Apparatus "Face Down" for the record of spending the most weeks on that chart (52 weeks). The record has since been broken by Rise Against's "Savior". It also found great success on the Billboard Adult Top 40, eventually climbing peaking at number three, their second top three song on that chart after "One Thing", which had reached number two.  It also hit number one on its recurrent chart. The song topped three million digital downloads in the United States in late December 2010, and as of January 2015, the song has sold 3.4 million copies in the U.S.

The track peaked at number 12 on the Australian Singles Chart based on downloads alone; an amazing achievement considering eighty percent of single sales come from physical releases. "Paralyzer" is one of the most successful hits for the band. At the end of the year, the single ranked number 58 for the year in Australia.

The single has been certified double platinum (2,457,058 downloads) by the RIAA.

On the Canadian Singles Chart, the song became the band's second number one following 2003's "One Thing." It also did well on the Canadian Hot 100, reaching number three. The song later debuted at number 10 on the New Zealand RIANZ chart in February 2008, becoming the band's first charting song there. It climbed to number seven the following week.

Usage in media
The song has been featured on the television series Gossip Girl and Greek.  It is also a playable song in the rhythm game Rock Revolution by Konami; although the game's producers have stated that all songs will be covers, the song is one of two for which the game uses the original master recording (the other being "Given Up" by Linkin Park). The song is also a playable song in the rhythm game Band Hero by Activision. The song is also on the Rock Band Network, and was introduced as DLC into Rocksmith by Ubisoft. The song is also part of the third game in the Guitar Hero On Tour Series for the Nintendo DS, Guitar Hero On Tour: Modern Hits''.

Charts

Weekly charts

Year-end charts

Certifications

References

2007 singles
Finger Eleven songs
Funk rock songs
Dance-rock songs
Canadian Singles Chart number-one singles
2006 songs
Wind-up Records singles
Torch songs
Songs about alcohol
Songs about mental health
Song recordings produced by Johnny K